Cleofé Elsa Calderón (October 26, 1929 – March 19, 2007) was an Argentine agrostologist.

Career 

She studied  at the University of Buenos Aires, with Lorenzo Parodi.

In October 1971, Calderón performed field operations and collected living materials of a new genus of grasses; the genus was named after her: Calderonella.

In 1976, Calderón rediscovered Anomochloa in Bahia, Brazil, with the help of assistant Talmon Soares dos Santos. By identifying this tropical forest grass, Calderón provided specimens for detailed morphological and anatomical study that confirmed it as a grass.

Selected works

References

External links 

 Who was Cleofé Calderón? - YouTube

20th-century Argentine botanists
Agrostologists
1929 births
2007 deaths
Women botanists
People from Buenos Aires
Smithsonian Institution people
20th-century Argentine women writers
20th-century Argentine women scientists